Methylobacterium organophilum  is a facultatively methylotrophic bacteria from the genus of Methylobacterium which was isolated from sediments from the Lake Mendota in Madison in the United States. Methylobacterium organophilum can degrade methanol.

References

Further reading

External links
Type strain of Methylobacterium organophilum at BacDive -  the Bacterial Diversity Metadatabase

Hyphomicrobiales
Bacteria described in 1976